Yusuf Lodhi (1938–1996) was a Pakistani editor, journal, cartoonist and author.

He began his editorial career working as assistant editor in 1969 of the Peshawar Times.

He later served in several well-known Pakistani newspapers, including The Daily Star, the Frontier Post, and "Herald" magazine of Dawn media group, before his death.

References 

1996 deaths
Pakistani writers
Pakistani cartoonists
Pakistani male journalists
Pashtun people
1938 births